Fazil Mustafa (born 15 October 1965) is an Azerbaijani politician who has been a member of the National Assembly since 2005.

Mustafa ran for President of Azerbaijan in the 2008 Azerbaijani presidential election.

References 

Living people
1965 births
21st-century Azerbaijani politicians
Politicians from Baku